Osteobrama belangeri is a species of ray-finned fish in the genus Osteobrama. It was found in the Indian state of Manipur, but has been extirpated there and as of 2022 is found in the wild only in Myanmar. Farmed populations in Manipur and wild-caught fish from in Myanmar are used as food. The extirpation from Manipur was caused by dam building, habitat degradation and the introduction of alien species which caused the populations to fragment.

Etymology
The fish is named in honor of botanist and explorer Charles Paulus Bélanger (1805-1881), who collected the type specimen.

Footnotes 

 

Belangeri
Taxa named by Achille Valenciennes
Fish described in 1844